Lijin or Likin may refer to:

 Likin (taxation) (厘金/禮金), system of taxation during the Taiping Rebellion in Qing China
 Lijin County (利津县), of Dongying City, Shandong, China
 Lijin Town (利津镇), seat of Lijin County
 Lijin, Iran (ليجين), a village in East Azerbaijan Province, Iran